The 2013–14 Hong Kong Reserve Division League was the fifty-sixth season since the establishment of the Hong Kong Reserve Division League.

The events in the senior league during the 2012–13 season saw Wofoo Tai Po relegated and replaced by I-Sky Yuen Long, Eastern Salon and Happy Valley. Each First Division teams will participate in the reserve division league, and play the teams in the league home and away, making a total of 22 matches played for each team.

League table

Results

Fixtures and results

Round 1

Round 2

Round 3

Round 4

Round 5

Round 6

Round 7

Round 8

Round 9

Round 10

Round 11

See also
 2013–14 Hong Kong First Division League
 2013–14 in Hong Kong football

References

Reserve
Hong Kong Reserve Division League